State Route 839 (SR 839) is an  road that runs from the Nevada Scheelite Mine to U.S. Route 50.  The road is also known as Nevada Scheelite Mine Road. Prior to the 1976 mass renumbering of Nevada State Routes this road was a disconnected segment of State Route 31.

Major intersections

References

839
Transportation in Churchill County, Nevada
Transportation in Mineral County, Nevada